Omadal Island is a Malaysian island located in the Celebes Sea on the state of Sabah.

See also
 List of islands of Malaysia

References

External links

Islands of Sabah